Coala is a helicopter action game developed by Bitfusion for the Amiga. It was published in 1995 by Empire Software.

Gameplay mainly consists of entering a battle between two sides. The player flies a helicopter, and may choose between AH-64 Apache, the MI-35 Hind and the Mi-28 Havoc. When the player scores 100 points, a fictional ultimate helicopter called A88 Coala is unlocked.

Coala is one of the few Amiga games with a virtual cockpit mode. The game required a 68020 processor.

External links
Coala at Lemon Amiga
Amiga Power review
Coala history by a Bitfusion team member

Amiga games
Amiga-only games
1995 video games
Combat flight simulators
Helicopter video games
Video games developed in the Netherlands
Empire Interactive games